Sieroszowice  (German: Kunzendorf) is a village in the administrative district of Gmina Radwanice, within Polkowice County, Lower Silesian Voivodeship, in south-western Poland. 

The village's German name probably derives from the name of a Lokator who brought German farmers to the village.

The village has a population of 420.

References

Villages in Polkowice County